"Girl Like U" is a song by American rapper Snoop Dogg, featuring American rapper and singer Nelly, taken from the former's seventh studio album R&G (Rhythm & Gangsta): The Masterpiece (2004). The song was written by Snoop Dogg, Nelly and L.T. Hutton, with production handled by L.T. Hutton.

Charts

References

2004 songs
Snoop Dogg songs
Nelly songs
Songs written by Snoop Dogg
Songs written by Nelly
Songs written by L.T. Hutton
Song recordings produced by L.T. Hutton